The Yindjilandji are an indigenous Australian people of the Northern Territory.

Language
The Yindjilandji language is usually grouped as one of the Ngarna languages, and considered a southern variety, and either a dialect of Wagawa if not an independent language.

Country
They were a Barkly Tableland people, occupying the area about Buchanan Creek and Ranken River, with a western limits toward Dalmore and Alroy Downs. Eastwards their terrain extended over the border with Queensland close to the headwaters of the Gregory River and Lawn Hill Creek.

Alternative names
 Bularnu
 Dhidhanu
 Inchalachee, Inchalanchee
 Indjilandji, Indjilindji
 Indjurandji
 Indkilindji. (? typo)
 Injilinji
 Intjilatja. (Alyawarre exonym)

Source:

Notes

Citations

Sources

Aboriginal peoples of the Northern Territory